Aab-e-Gum Railway Station (also spelled Ab-i-Gum) is located in the town of Aab-e-gum, Kachhi District of Balochistan province, Pakistan.

Aab-e-gum is a Persian word meaning 'vanished water', a name given to a nearby underground spring.

Services
The following trains stop at Aab-e-Gum station:

Stops
Only the Jaffar Express has a stop at the Aab-e-Gum Railway Station.

Incidents
 17 November 2015, the Jaffar Express derailed at Aab-e-Gum, killing 20 and injuring 96 people.

See also
 List of railway stations in Pakistan
 Pakistan Railways

References

Railway stations in Kachhi District
Railway stations opened in 1886
Railway stations on Rohri–Chaman Railway Line